KidzSearch.com is an American visual child-safe search engine and web portal powered by Google Programmable Search Engine with academic autocomplete that emphasizes safety for children. It uses Google's Safe Search technology with additional search term filtering for added safety. Search results are customized by pushing age-appropriate content higher up in their search results. Large thumbnails are provided to make results more visual and easier to understand for children. It has many features, and boasts an online encyclopedia with 200,000 articles powered by MediaWiki. 

KidzSearch is used in thousands of schools each day, and is visited by some 14 million people a month. KidzSearch was rated by Common Sense Media who compared it to Google. Their main focus is on older elementary and middle school students. They partnered with Safe Search Kids to host their search results and wiki pages. Network security company Untangle integrated KidzSearch into their system when safe browsing is enabled

History 
The site was launched on April 8, 2005. In 2015, KidzSearch went under an extensive  redesign process with a mobile responsive layout.

Services 
KidzNet is an online moderated social media network designed for kids, where they can post anything safe except for personal information. It is powered by OSSN. All posts are reviewed before they are published. It got a major revamp in October 2021.

KidzTalk is an online question and answer portal for kids, powered by Question2Answer. A user types a question or comment, and another answers it. All answers are reviewed by KidzSearch staff for safety and quality. KidzTalk is generally used for homework. It currently has over 11,200 users, 51,600 answers, 18,100 questions, 46,100 comments, and a leaderboard showing which user has gotten the most "points" answering content. All content can be "upvoted" and users can select the "best answer" to their question.

KidzTube contains handpicked videos. Most are educational. If a user searches for a term such as 'pooping', the service will present educational content such as facts about the digestive system, or a Minecraft video.

Games - Mobile and desktop games are offered that include both educational and entertainment titles. Games are reviewed for safety and quality. Popular games include Slither.IO and Mine Clone. KidzSearch has over 57,000 free games.
KidzArt - This is a service currently on the drawing board. It would allow users to post photos of their art. There is no release date set for KidzArt.
Apps - KidzSearch has an app for mobile devices that provides similar services as the web version.

Other  
KidzSearch selects news articles appropriate for kids that can be 'up voted' by the user. Their music service has kid-friendly music stations. KidzSearch offers a website directory of kid-friendly websites. KidzSearch also includes a website with daily facts for kids. In the KidzSearch Wiki students can research kid-friendly articles designed for their reading levels. Boolify helps users learn how to use a search engine using a graphical interface.

Criticism 
KidzSearch has been criticized by Common Sense Media for packing too many ads into their search results.

Many users criticized KidzNet after the major revamp.

See also 
Kiddle
KidRex

References

External links 
 

Internet search engines